Susan Smith-Pinelo is an African-American artist noted for her work in video and performance.  She lives and works in Washington, DC.

Education
Smith-Pinelo received a B.F.A. from Oberlin College in 1991. She received a M.F.A. from Columbia University in 2000.

Work 
Susan Smith-Pinelo's work challenges conceptions of black identity and gender in rap music, and is particularly concerned with questioning the misogyny of the genre. For example, her 2001 Studio Museum in Harlem installation Sometimes has a close-up video of a black woman's breasts with a necklace saying "ghetto" around her neck dancing to music which sounds through the museum. Sometimes plays with form in order to "confront perceptions of black identity and femininity."

Awards and fellowships

Among the honors which Susan Smith-Pinelo has earned are:

Joan Sovern Sculpture Award (1999)

Selected exhibitions
Susan Smith-Pinelo’s work has been featured in exhibitions at numerous galleries and institutions including:

 Musée d'Art Moderne de la Ville de Paris, Paris, France Playback (2007)
 Zachęta National Gallery of Art, Warsaw, Poland black alphabet (2006)
 Bronx Museum of the Arts, New York City, USA Music/Video (2006)
 Museum Villa Stuck, Munich, Germany One Planet Under A Groove (2003)
 Longwood Arts Project, New York City, USA DL: The “Down Low” in Contemporary Art (2003)
 The Corcoran Gallery of Art, Washington, DC, USA Fantasy Underfoot - The 47th Biennial Exhibition (2002)
 Carnegie Museum of Art, Pittsburg, USA Forum - Hello, My Name Is... (2002)
 Bronx Museum of the Arts, New York City, USA One Planet Under a Grove: Hip Hop and Contemporary Art (2001)
 Los Angeles Contemporary Exhibitions, Los Angeles, USA "Third Annual Altoids Curiously Strong Collection" (2001)
 The Studio Museum in Harlem, New York City, USA Freestyle (2001)

Collections
Smith-Pinelo's work is held in permanent collections including:

 Norton Family Foundation, Los Angeles, USA
 Altoids Curiously Strong Collection/New Museum of Contemporary Art, New York, USA

References

External links
 Susan Smith-Pinelo, Sometimes, 2000

Living people
21st-century American artists
African-American contemporary artists
American contemporary artists
21st-century American women artists
American women performance artists
American performance artists
American women video artists
American video artists
Artists from Washington, D.C.
Oberlin College alumni
Columbia University School of the Arts alumni
20th-century American artists
20th-century American women artists
Year of birth missing (living people)
20th-century African-American women
20th-century African-American people
20th-century African-American artists
21st-century African-American women
21st-century African-American artists